The Excelsior-Mascot was a German automobile manufactured in Cologne-Nippes from 1911 until 1922.  Only a few, with two- and four-cylinder proprietary engines of 8 hp to 18 hp, were produced.

References

Defunct motor vehicle manufacturers of Germany
Cars introduced in 1911
Vehicle manufacturing companies established in 1911
Vehicle manufacturing companies disestablished in 1922
1922 disestablishments in Germany
German companies established in 1911
Economy of Cologne